The European Cultural Convention is an international Council of Europe's treaty to strengthen, deepen and further develop a European culture, by using local culture as a starting point. Setting common goals and a plan of action to reach an integrated European society, celebrating universal values, rights and diversity. The Convention contributes to joint action by encouraging cultural activities of European interest.

History
The European Cultural Convention was opened for signature by the Council of Europe in Paris on 19 December 1954 and entered into force on 5 May 1955. Its signature is one of the conditions for becoming a participating state in the Bologna Process and its European Higher Education Area (EHEA). The term "Convention" is used as a synonym for an international legal treaty.

The convention has been ratified by all 47 member states of the Council of Europe and also by Belarus, the Holy See, and Kazakhstan.

The Council of Europe's Youth Sector with the European Youth Foundation, the European Youth Centres and its co-managed structures like the Advisory Council on Youth (AC) and the European Steering Committee for Youth (CDEJ) covers all countries signatory to the European Cultural Convention, because the youth sector originally came under the Directorate of Education, Culture and Sport.

Members

The 50 Signatories to the European Cultural Convention are:

See also 
 European Heritage Days
 European integration
 Erasmus+
 Culture 21
 List of Council of Europe treaties
 Member states of the Council of Europe
 Pan-European identity
 Politics of Europe

References

External links 

 German Wikisource
 European Cultural Convention at the website of the Council of Europe

Council of Europe treaties
Treaties concluded in 1954
Treaties entered into force in 1955
Treaties of Albania
Treaties of Andorra
Treaties of Armenia
Treaties of Austria
Treaties of Azerbaijan
Treaties of Belgium
Treaties of Bosnia and Herzegovina
Treaties of Bulgaria
Treaties of Croatia
Treaties of Cyprus
Treaties of the Czech Republic
Treaties of Denmark
Treaties of Estonia
Treaties of Finland
Treaties of France
Treaties of Georgia (country)
Treaties of West Germany
Treaties of Greece
Treaties of Hungary
Treaties of Iceland
Treaties of Ireland
Treaties of Italy
Treaties of Latvia
Treaties of Liechtenstein
Treaties of Lithuania
Treaties of Luxembourg
Treaties of Malta
Treaties of Moldova
Treaties of Monaco
Treaties of Montenegro
Treaties of the Netherlands
Treaties of Norway
Treaties of Poland
Treaties of Portugal
Treaties of Romania
Treaties of Russia
Treaties of San Marino
Treaties of Serbia and Montenegro
Treaties of Slovakia
Treaties of Slovenia
Treaties of Spain
Treaties of Sweden
Treaties of Switzerland
Treaties of North Macedonia
Treaties of Turkey
Treaties of Ukraine
Treaties of the United Kingdom
Treaties of Belarus
Treaties of the Holy See
Treaties of Kazakhstan
1954 in France
Art and culture treaties
Treaties extended to the Isle of Man
Treaties extended to Gibraltar
Treaties extended to Jersey
Treaties extended to Greenland
Treaties extended to the Faroe Islands